Miskin is a small village in the district of Pontyclun, Rhondda Cynon Taf, Wales

Miskin may also refer to:

Miskin, Mountain Ash, a village in Penrhiwceiber, Rhondda Cynon Taf, Wales 
Miskin Manor, an 1864 Victorian manor house in Miskin in Rhondda Cynon Taf, Wales
Miskin Radio, a student-run radio station at North Kent College
Sir James Miskin QC, British barrister and judge who served as Recorder of London 1975–90
Miskin (painter), a Mughal-era painter in the court of Akbar I
Myshkin (surname), a Russian surname

See also
Battle of Maroua–Miskin (18–21 January 1902), between Fulani troops and the German Schutztruppe in Cameroon
Miskin's swift (Sabera dobboe), a butterfly of the family Hesperiidae